Kassim Ahmad (9 September 1933 – 10 October 2017) was a Malaysian Muslim philosopher, intellectual, writer, poet and an educator. He was also a socialist politician in the early days of Malaya and later Malaysia and was detained without trial from 1976 to 1981 under Malaysia's Internal Security Act.

Early life

Kassim was born in Bukit Pinang, Kota Setar in the northern Malaysian state of Kedah in 1933. His parents were Ahmad Ishaq and Ummi Kalthom Ahmad. One of them originated from Pattani, Thailand. Kassim's grandfather was a farmer and a religious teacher who lived in Perai, Penang. In 1960, Kassim married Sharifah Fauziah binti Yussof Alsaggof.

Education

He attended a Malay primary school in Bandar Baharu before attending Sultan Abdul Hamid College for his secondary education. He later went to Singapore to enrol at the University of Malaya in the 1950s.

In Singapore, he completed his dissertation that challenged the popular status of Hang Tuah as a Malay hero. Hang Tuah is a Malay legendary warrior mentioned extensively in The Malay Annals and Hikayat Hang Tuah. Kassim instead argued that Hang Tuah's antagonist Hang Jebat was the hero. In Malay legends, Hang Tuah fought and killed his sworn brother Hang Jebat who rose up against an unjust sultan. The former is celebrated for his loyalty to the sultan, despite suffering injustice from the courts.

He was preparing for his doctorate degree in political science in 1976 when the government detained him without trial for five years.

Career

Upon graduation from the university, he worked as a researcher at Dewan Bahasa dan Pustaka (Institute of Language and Literature) in Kuala Lumpur where he specialised in Hang Tuah literature. Soon after, he moved to London to lecture on Malay language at the School of Oriental and African Studies for four years. Due to his deep interest in Malayan politics, he refused to take up a permanent position at SOAS and decided to return home. Upon his return to Malaya, he taught at a school in Penang. His service as a teacher was terminated after he was found distributing socialist pamphlets to his students.

Activism and political participation

Kassim was an active member of the University Socialist Club in the 1950s, a left-wing student body in Malaya and Singapore. He was also a member of Parti Rakyat Malaysia when Ahmad Boestamam was the president.

He later went on to lead the political body together with Syed Husin Ali from 1965 until 1980 before joining the ruling United Malay National Organisation.

He was arrested under the Internal Security Act for 5 years beginning 1976 for allegedly supporting a socialist-communist movement in Malaysia. Syed Husin himself had been arrested two years earlier on similar grounds.

Kassim was later released on 30 July 1981 after Mahathir Mohamad became the prime minister. Mahathir first met Kassim at the University of Malaya, and had written forewords for Kassim's books.

Islam and Quranism

In 1984, he wrote Hadis: Satu Penilaian Semula (Hadith: A Re-evaluation), a book questioning the role of hadith in Islam, and ignited a debate on Quranism in Malaysia. The book was banned by the Home Ministry in 1986.

He died in Kulim, Kedah, on October 10, 2017.

Publication

This is a partial list of his work:

 Characterisation in Hikayat Hang Tuah (1966)
 Kemarau di Lembah (1967)
 Perwatakan dalam Hikayat Hang Tuah (1973)
 Pengembara Dalam Perjalanan (1978)
 Universiti Kedua (1983)
 Hadis: Satu Penilaian Semula (1984)
 Hadis: Jawapan Kepada Pengkritik (1992)
 Quo Vadis Bangsaku?
 Polemik Sastera Islam
 Mencari Jalan Pulang Daripada Sosialisme Kepada Islam
 Jalan Ke Parlimen
 Hikayat Hang Tuah
 Lamumba Mati

Awards
 Doctorate of Letters, Universiti Kebangsaan Malaysia (1985)
 Anugerah GAPENA (1987)
 Anugerah Zaaba (2016)

References

1933 births
2017 deaths
Academics of SOAS University of London
Parti Rakyat Malaysia politicians
Malaysian people of Thai descent
Malaysian socialists
Quranist Muslims
University of Malaya alumni